Dorothy Hoover may refer to:
 Dorothy Haines Hoover (1904–1995), Canadian painter
 Dorothy McFadden Hoover (1918–2000), American physicist and mathematician